Frederick Wilson may refer to:

 Frederick Wilson (film editor) (1912–1994), British film editor and director
 Frederick Wilson (artist) (1858–1932), British stained glass artist
 Frederick Wilson (Raja) (1817–1883), British hunter, timber trader, and entrepreneur and settler in India, also sometime referred to Pahari Wilson or the Raja of Harsil
 Frederick William Wilson (1844–1924), British politician and newspaper owner
 Rick Wilson (political consultant) (born 1963), born Frederick Wilson, American political strategist, media consultant, and author

See also
 Frederic Wilson (1881–1932), English sportsman and journalist
 Fred Wilson (disambiguation)